James Guy Tucker Jr. (born June 13, 1943) is an American politician and attorney from Arkansas. A member of the Democratic Party, he served as the 43rd governor of Arkansas, the 15th lieutenant governor, state attorney general, and U.S. representative. Tucker resigned the governorship and was replaced by Mike Huckabee on July 16, 1996, after his conviction for fraud during the Whitewater affair.

Early life
Tucker was born in Oklahoma City and moved to Arkansas before school age. He attended public schools in Little Rock, graduating from Hall High School in 1961. He had his first taste of politics when he ran for and was elected Vice-President of Key Club International (the largest and oldest high school service organization in the United States). He served in that organization from 1960–61. He received a bachelor of arts degree from Harvard University in 1963.

Early career
Tucker served in the United States Marine Corps Reserve in 1964, but was discharged for medical reasons (chronic ulcers) after finishing the first phase of his officer candidate training class at Camp Upshur at Marine Corps Base Quantico in Quantico, Virginia. In early 1965, Tucker found passage to southeast Asia by tramp steamer from San Francisco and entered South Vietnam as an accredited freelance war correspondent.

With one brief sojourn home, he remained in the war zone through 1967, personally participating in a number of engagements. Late that year, he published Arkansas Men at War, a compendium of interviews with troops from the state he had followed into combat. The book received generally favorable reviews.

Following a brief stint as an assistant professor of American history at the American University of Beirut in Lebanon, Tucker returned to the University of Arkansas Law School in 1968 as a second-year student, graduated, and was admitted to the bar that same year.

Law career
Tucker practiced as a junior associate with the Rose Law Firm, from which he ran for prosecuting attorney in 1970. He served as prosecutor for the Sixth Judicial District of Arkansas 1971–1972. In that office, he oversaw the prosecution of more than 1,000 backlogged felony cases inherited from previous administrations. He won convictions in several cases considered by local observers as "impossible" successfully to prosecute, including one kidnapping.

Twelve "guest" judges were temporarily reassigned from other circuits by the state supreme court at Tucker's request to clear the docket. He was appointed by the Governor to the Arkansas Criminal Code Revision Commission and served from 1973 to 1975, during which time he was credited with spearheading the group's broad revision of the state's criminal laws.

An investigation into police corruption he began was stymied by a county grand jury appointed by a circuit judge who was a political ally of the chief of police. However, the following year, a federal grand jury, building on Tucker's work, issued a scathing report which led to a shake-up of the department and the resignation of the chief, senior detectives and complicit city officials.

Political career

Tucker was a delegate to the 1972 Democratic National Convention and was elected Arkansas Attorney General in November 1972 at the age of 29. He easily defeated the Republican nominee Edwin Bethune, then of Searcy in White County, and later Tucker's successor as U.S. Representative from the Little Rock–based Arkansas's 2nd congressional district.

Tucker served two 2-year terms as attorney general, 1973–1977. He and the state's chief justice served as co-chairmen of the Arkansas Criminal Code Revision Commission. This was the first effort at codification of the state's criminal code and was adopted by the State's General Assembly. Tucker also began intervening in utility rate cases before the Arkansas Public Service Commission and fought to require "scrubbers" on a large coal-fired generation plant. He served as co-chairman of the Consumer Protection Committee of the National Association of Attorneys General. Running from his post as attorney general, Tucker was elected as a Democrat to the Ninety-fifth Congress and served one term, January 3, 1977 – January 3, 1979. He served on the Ways & Means Committee, on the Sub-Committee on Social Security, and on a special committee on welfare reform.

He relinquished the seat to wage an unsuccessful campaign for the United States Senate in 1978. He was defeated by the sitting governor, David Pryor. In the same election, Bill Clinton, who had replaced Tucker in 1977 as attorney general, was elected governor.

Tucker resumed his law practice. A consistent intra-party rival of Clinton, he was defeated by Clinton when both sought the Democratic nomination for governor in 1982 following Clinton's defeat by Republican Frank White in 1980. He then became a partner in the firm of Mitchell, Williams, Selig & Tucker and served as lead trial counsel in complex litigation. Eight years later, Tucker announced his intention to run for the governor's office again against Clinton, who was seeking a fifth term and was expected to seek the Democratic nomination for president. However, he withdrew from the gubernatorial primary and ran instead for the post of lieutenant governor.

Tucker recognized that Clinton had his eyes on the presidency and might not serve a full term. Tucker, in accordance with a state constitutional provision barring a governor from executing duties while traveling outside of the state, served as acting governor on a near-constant basis between Clinton's campaign launch during the summer of 1991 and the election in November 1992, relinquishing gubernatorial powers and duties only on the few occasions when Clinton returned to the state, such as to oversee the execution of Ricky Ray Rector. Tucker succeeded to the governorship upon Clinton's resignation on December 12, 1992 follow the latter's election to the presidency.

Tucker called a special session of the General Assembly that same week to solve a financial crisis for the state's Medicaid system. At his urging, the legislature adopted a soft drink tax, proceeds of which were placed in a trust account for Medicaid matching purposes. The soft drink industry obtained sufficient signatures to attempt a repeal. The soft drink tax prevailed with over 60% of the vote. Tucker won election in 1994 with over 59% of the vote against Republican Sheffield Nelson to a four-year term as governor and was sworn into a full four-year term on January 10, 1995.

Conviction and resignation
Tucker was convicted of one count of conspiracy and one count of mail fraud on May 28, 1996, as part of Kenneth Starr's investigation of the Whitewater scandal. Tucker was tried with fellow defendants James B. McDougal and his wife Susan McDougal. The prosecution was conducted primarily by OIC prosecutor Ray Jahn. Tucker chose not to testify in his own defense upon the advice of his attorney. Tucker received a lenient sentence of four years' probation and house detention in part because of his poor health. He was placed on the Mayo Clinic liver transplant list in June 1996.

Arkansas, like most other states, has a provision in its state constitution barring convicted felons from elective office. As a result, Tucker announced his intention to resign. As lieutenant governor, Mike Huckabee, a Republican, was preparing to be sworn in, Tucker announced he would delay his resignation until the trial court hearing on several grounds, including the post-trial discovery that a juror in his trial was married to a man whose cocaine possession conviction Tucker had twice refused to commute. Furthermore, this juror was the niece of local activist Robert "Say" McIntosh, who had demonstrated against Tucker during the trial. He argued that his conviction was thus tainted, and that the Arkansas Constitution was vague about his status as a convicted felon until his post trial motions were ruled on. However, several hours later he did resign that same day, under the threat of impeachment by the legislature which had informally gathered to witness Huckabee's swearing in.

Business
Beginning in the early 1980s, while practicing law, Tucker and his wife Betty began building cable television and pay per view systems in Central Arkansas, and later in the Dallas–Fort Worth corridor north of DFW Airport and in southern Florida. In the early 1990s, Tucker partnered with Insight Cable to purchase and expand cable television systems in London. That company later merged with others and was taken public in London. Beginning in the mid-1990s, Tucker and his wife, along with James Riady, established a cable television company in Indonesia. In 1998, in the midst of an Indonesian financial and political crisis, the company almost went bankrupt. Tucker traveled to Indonesia in January 1999 and with the Riady family created a new company called Kabelvision, and built and expanded systems in greater Jakarta ('Jabotabek'), in Surabaya, and in Bali. In 2000, the company was merged into new company called AcrossAsia Multimedia Ltd. It was listed on the Global Emerging Markets (GEM) Exchange in Hong Kong that same year. With AcrossAsia Multimedia, they built what was then the largest cable TV and Internet infrastructure in Indonesia.

Health problems
Beginning during his college years at Harvard, Tucker suffered from an autoimmune disease, later diagnosed as primary sclerosing cholangitis. It created severe liver problems which seriously debilitated him and threatened his life (he had nearly died from gastrointestinal bleeding in 1994, and had steadily worsened since). On Christmas Day 1996, Tucker received a liver transplant at the Mayo Clinic in Rochester, Minnesota.

See also
List of governors of Arkansas

Footnotes

References

Further reading

(Updated 7-4-97). Arkansas Roots. CNN.
James Guy Tucker Jr. (1993–1996). Old State House Museum of Arkansas History
Whitewater. Court TV.
Congress Bio at the Biographical Directory of the United States Congress
Lehrer, Jim; Mark Shields; Paul Gigot; Rex Nelson (MAY 29, 1996). THE VERDICT. PBS
Time Line (1995–1998). Washington Post
Haddigan, Michael (August 20, 1996).  Tucker Sentenced to 4 Years' Probation. Washington Post.
Encyclopedia of Arkansas History & Culture entry: Jim Guy Tucker
 
Finding Aid, James Guy Tucker Jr., Papers,  UA Little Rock Center for Arkansas History and Culture

|-

Democratic Party governors of Arkansas
Arkansas Attorneys General
American Presbyterians
American prosecutors
Disbarred American lawyers
1943 births
Living people
Lieutenant Governors of Arkansas
Harvard University alumni
Politicians from Little Rock, Arkansas
Politicians from Oklahoma City
United States Marines
Academic staff of the American University of Beirut
American politicians convicted of fraud
Democratic Party members of the United States House of Representatives from Arkansas
Arkansas politicians convicted of crimes
Whitewater controversy
Bill Clinton
Hall High School (Arkansas) alumni